Kingsway is an unincorporated community in Rice Township, Sandusky County, Ohio, United States.

History
A post office called Kingsway was established in 1882, and remained in operation until 1911. The community was named for George W. King, first postmaster.

References

Populated places in Sandusky County, Ohio